Piptoptera is a monotypic genus of flowering plants belonging to the family Amaranthaceae. The only species is Piptoptera turkestana.

Its native range is Iran to Central Asia and Afghanistan.

References

Amaranthaceae
Amaranthaceae genera
Monotypic Caryophyllales genera
Taxa named by Alexander von Bunge